Matthew's gospel and Luke's gospel record Jesus' message of woe to the unrepentant cities of Chorazin, Bethsaida and Capernaum, located around the northern shore of the Sea of Galilee, for their refusal to repent.

The text in Matthew's gospel states:

The three cities mentioned lay just north of the Sea of Galilee. Chorazin is not otherwise mentioned in the Gospels. Bethsaida is where Philip, Andrew, and Peter were from, and where Jesus healed a blind man. Capernaum, however, is mentioned many times in the Gospels and was the site of many of Jesus' healings and miracles, serving for a time as the center of his public ministry.

Tyre and Sidon were cities against which the prophets of the Old Testament had pronounced God's judgment. Sodom was infamous as the city which, according to the Book of Genesis, God had spectacularly destroyed for its wickedness in the time of Abraham.

In essence, then, Jesus is contrasting three Jewish towns where he has performed many signs, with three Gentile cities known for such extraordinary wickedness as to deserve God's destruction, saying that on the Day of Judgment the former will be judged more harshly, because of their greater unwillingness to repent.

These cities are associated with the Antichrist in medieval sources. The Apocalypse of Pseudo-Methodius, commenting on the above Gospel passage, states that the Antichrist "will be conceived in Chorazin, be born in Bethsaida, and begin to rule in Capernaum."

Commentary
Cornelius a Lapide comments on the verse "Truly, I say unto you, it shall be more tolerable..." writing that the citizens of Tyre and Sidon will be punished because of their wickednesses, but that the Galilæans will be punished more severely: "1. Because ye had greater knowledge of God’s law, and virtue. 2. Because ye have often heard Me preaching and exhorting to repentance, and have beheld Me doing many miracles, none of which things the Tyrians have either seen or heard." He draws the further moral point that Christians will be punished more severely in the day of judgment than Jews; the Roman citizens, than Indians; priests, nuns and monks, than laymen; if the former lived sinful lives, because "they have received greater degrees of grace and knowledge from God, and would not make use of them, but abused them to their own greater damnation."

See also
 Woes of the Pharisees – a list of criticisms by Jesus against scribes and Pharisees
 The four woes of Jesus

References

Doctrines and teachings of Jesus
Bethsaida
Capernaum
Sea of Galilee
Gospel of Matthew
Gospel of Luke
Chorazin